"Living in Stereo" is a song by German dance band R.I.O., released  for digital download in Germany on 15 March 2013.

"Living in Stereo" achieved minor commercial success, peaking at number 41 on the Ö3 Austria Top 40, number 70 on the Official German Charts and number 32 on the Schweizer Hitparade Chart.

Music video
A music video to accompany the release of "Living in Stereo" was first released onto YouTube on March 15, 2013 at a total length of three minutes and seventeen seconds.

Track listing

Chart performance

Weekly charts

Release history

References

2013 singles
R.I.O. songs
2013 songs
Kontor Records singles
Songs written by Andres Ballinas
Songs written by Yanou
Songs written by DJ Manian